Magnhild Rita Eia (born 15 January 1960) is a Norwegian politician for the Centre Party.

She served as a deputy representative to the Norwegian Parliament from Rogaland during the term 1993–1997, 1997–2001, 2001–2005 and 2005–2009.

From 2005 to 2007, during the second cabinet Stoltenberg, she was a political advisor in the Ministry of Local Government and Regional Development.

On the local level, she has been deputy mayor of Lund.

References

1960 births
Living people
Deputy members of the Storting
Centre Party (Norway) politicians
Rogaland politicians
People from Lund, Norway